Saul V. Levine (born 1938) is a Canadian psychiatrist and author, professor emeritus at various universities for psychiatry at University of California, San Diego, School of Medicine; Stanford University Medical School; and University of Toronto (1970–1993). He was chairman of the Department of Psychiatry at Rady Children’s Hospital, San Diego, from 1993–2011. He was department head of psychiatry at Sunnybrook Medical Center in Toronto, Ontario, Canada.

Author
Levine is the author of several books, including Radical Departures: Desperate Detours to Growing Up, The Child in the City, Youth and Contemporary Religious Movements: Psychosocial Findings, and Tell Me It's Only a Phase!: A Guide for Parents of Teenagers.

Levine's book Radical Departures is cited in The Canadian Encyclopedia article on new religious movements:
University of Toronto psychiatrist Saul V. Levine made a study of deprogramming in his book Radical Departures (1984). He concluded that as a means of changing people's views it was not only a failure but positively dangerous. These conclusions were supported by other scholars who provided civil libertarians, religious leaders in established churches and members of new religions with evidence against the practice of deprogramming. As a result it gradually fell into disrepute.

Publications

Books
Dear Doctor, 1987, 
Tell Me It's Only a Phase! A Guide for Parents of Teenagers, Olympic Marketing Corp., June 1987, 
Radical Departures: Desperate Detours to Growing Up, March 1986, Harvest Books, 
The Child in the City, June 1979, University of Toronto Press, 
Youth and Contemporary Religious Movements: Psychosocial Findings, 1976, Canadian Psychiatric Association, ASIN B0007AZZLC

Articles
"Alienated Jewish Youth and Religious Seminaries—An Alternative to Cults?", Saul L. Levine, Adolescence, v19 n73 p183-99 Spring 1984
"Youth and Contemporary Religious Movements: Psychosocial Findings", Saul V. Levine & Nancy E. Salter, 21(6) Canadian Psychology Association Journal 411-20 1976
"Radical Departures", Saul V. Levine, Psychology Today, August 1984, 27.
"Brief Psychotherapy with Children: A Preliminary Report", Alan J. Rosenthal and Saul V. Levine, Am. J. Psychiatry 1970 127: 646–651
"Brief Psychotherapy with Children: Process of Therapy", Alan J. Rosenthal, M.D., Assistant Professor, Department of Psychiatry, Stanford University Medical Center, Stanford, Calif. 94305, Saul V. Levine, M.D., Assistant Professor, Department of Psychiatry, University of Toronto, Staff Psychiatrist, the Hospital for Sick Children, Toronto, Ontario, Canada, Am. J. Psychiatry 128:141–146, August 1971, American Psychiatric Association
"Life in the Cults" in Cults and New Religious Movements: A Report of the American Psychiatric Association, ed. Marc Galanter (Washington DC: American Psychiatric Association, 1989).
"The Urban Commune: Fact or Fad, Promise or Pipe Dream", Saul V. Levine, et al., 1971, Toronto University, ERIC #: ED067571
"Teenage Sexuality and Sex Education: Identifying Problems and Solutions", S. Ziegler, V.  Young, S.V. Levine – 1984 – Centre for Urban and Community Studies, University of Toronto

References

External links
School shooter used antidepressants: Psychiatrist says pills Hoffman took are safe, By Alex Roth, San Diego Union-Tribune, April 19, 2001

See also
List of cult and new religious movement researchers

Canadian psychiatrists
1938 births
Living people
Academic staff of the University of Toronto
Researchers of new religious movements and cults
Critics of the Unification Church
University of California, San Diego faculty